Radio Television Kragujevac (RTV Kragujevac;  / ) is only one local television station in Kragujevac, Serbia and one of three regional television stations in Šumadija and Pomoravlje Region. They are trying to become not only commercial but educational stations too. They can be received in a wide region of central Serbia.

External links

Television stations in Serbia
Mass media in Kragujevac
Television channels and stations established in 1994